Subroto Tara Banerjee  (born 13 February 1969) is a former Indian cricketer who played in one Test and 6 ODIs from 1991 to 1992.

He was a member of the Indian cricket team that played in the 1992 World Cup. The one Test that he played for India was also the Test debut of Australian cricket player Shane Warne. He played in the third Test at Sydney Cricket Ground as the fourth seamer as Indian cricket team took the field without a specialist spinner where he took three wickets for 47 which includes Mark Waugh, Mark Taylor and Geoff Marsh in first-innings.

See also
One Test Wonder

References

External links

1969 births
India One Day International cricketers
India Test cricketers
Indian cricketers
East Zone cricketers
Bengal cricketers
Bihar cricketers
Living people
Cricketers from Patna
Indian cricket coaches
Cricketers at the 1992 Cricket World Cup